The 1903 Georgia Tech football team represented the Georgia Institute of Technology during the 1903 Southern Intercollegiate Athletic Association football season.  Despite Tech sources not recording it, Mercer sources insist Georgia Tech defeated Mercer in 1903 by a score of 46 to 0.

Schedule

Season summary

Week 1: Clemson
Clemson's 73–0 victory over Georgia Tech led Clemson to name a street on the campus for John Heisman and to Georgia Tech's hiring him the next season. The week before Clemson beat Georgia  29 to 0.  Georgia offered a bushel of apples for every point Clemson could score over its rival Tech. Clemson rushed for 615 yards.

References

Georgia Tech
Georgia Tech Yellow Jackets football seasons
Georgia Tech football